Travelling Victor (1979–1992) was a Canadian Thoroughbred Champion racehorse bred by Russell and Lois Bennett at their Flying Horse Farm in Westbank, British Columbia. In 1983, the horse made history when he became the first horse ever to be voted Canadian Horse of the Year honours who had not competed in the Province of Ontario.

During his career, Travelling Victor raced at tracks in Vancouver as well as in the State of Washington.

Retired having won twenty-one races, of which fifteen were stakes events, Travelling Victor was standing at stud for his owners when he died unexpectedly in 1992. He is buried at Flying Horse Farm.

References

Travelling Victor's pedigree and partial racing stats
Travelling Victor's web page at the Flying Horse Farm website

1979 racehorse births
1992 racehorse deaths
Racehorses bred in Canada
Racehorses trained in Canada
Canadian Thoroughbred Horse of the Year
Thoroughbred family 1-x